The first 100 days of Gustavo Petro's presidency began on 7 August 2022, the day Gustavo Petro was Inaugurated as the 34th President of Colombia. The first 100 days of a presidential term have acquired a symbolic meaning during which it is considered a reference point to measure the initial success of a president. The 100th day of his presidency ended at noon on 15 November 2022.

Institutionally, President Petro had the advantage of a majority of the political coalition founded by him, the Historical Pact, in the Senate and the Chamber of Representatives, as well as alliances with the Green, Conservative, Liberal and of the Party of the U but could not fulfill its main promises in its first 100 days, even so, some of the surveys showed a good image of the projection of the government, considering 100 days a short time for reforms that can take months or even years.

Pledges
Petro committed to do the following in its first 100 days:

Reestablish bilateral relations as well as trade between Colombia and Venezuela.
Increase aid to farmers with the purchase of three million hectares in order to promote agri-food.
Approval of the tax reform proposed by the
The fulfillment of the peace agreements with the FARC, as well as the opening of a dialogue table with the ELN, for the so-called total peace.
Started the preventive health program, which will be carried out to be effective in the reform of Law 100 in the first months of 2023
The launch of the program for the protection of the Amazon began.

Inauguration

The first 100 days of the Presidency of Gustavo Petro began during the inauguration of Gustavo Petro with the conversion of Presidencia.gov.co from the version of the Duque Administration to the version of the Petro Administration at 12:00 on August 10 of 2022, as well as other official pages. This was the third transition of the online presidential portal.

In addition, announcements suggestive of the new government and the official slogan "The government of change" were added to the official government pages, continuing with the theme of the previous administration "the government of all"

Administration and Cabinet

On August 10, 2022, Petro's cabinet was complete. included  Minister of the Interior, Alfonso Prada,  of Foreign Affairs, Álvaro Leyva, Finance, José Antonio Ocampo, Justice and Law, Néstor Osuna, Defense, Iván Velásquez, Agriculture, Cecilia López, of Health, Carolina Corcho, of Labour, Gloria Inés Ramírez, of Energy, Irene Vélez, of Commerce German Umaña, of National Education, Alejandro Gaviria, Evironment and Sustainable Development, Susana Muhamad, of Housing, City and Territory, Catalina Velasco, of Information Technologies and Communications, Sandra Urrutia, of Transport, Guillermo Reyes, of Culture, Patricia Ariza, of Sports, María Isabel Urrutia, of Science, Technology and Innovation, Arturo Luis Luna.

Domestic policy
Within its domestic policy, Petro has emphasized the implementatin of the peace agreements, suspended during the administration of its predecessor, including the peace negotiation with illegal armed groups in order to put the community at the center of these negotiations, while be the most affected.

Tax reform
Within its first 100 days of administration, one of its main triumphs was the tax reform after the failure of the tax reform of the Duque administration, which was rejected by a large part of Colombian society during the year 2020, the tax reform of the Petro administration was debated in the Senate and the House of Representatives and was subsequently approved in order to raise an average of 20 billion pesos between 2023 and 2026, equivalent to 26% of the government investment budget, treating a huge injection with which the petro administration will seek to finance its political program.

The reform has a majority of collection in companies, being the hydrocarbon sectors and the upper social class, the ones that contribute the most, in this sense, it seeks to fulfill the main objective of making the tax system more progressive.

Colombian conflict 

Within a month, a deadly attack on police officers in Huila challenged Petro's push for peace.

References

Gustavo Petro
Presidency of Gustavo Petro
2022 in Colombia
2022 in politics
August 2022 events in South America